Marcela Cuaspud (born 28 April 1995) is an Ecuadorian modern pentathlete. She competed in the women's event at the 2020 Summer Olympics.

References

External links
 

1995 births
Living people
Ecuadorian female modern pentathletes
Modern pentathletes at the 2020 Summer Olympics
Olympic modern pentathletes of Ecuador
Sportspeople from Quito
Pan American Games competitors for Ecuador
Modern pentathletes at the 2019 Pan American Games
21st-century Ecuadorian women
20th-century Ecuadorian women